Les Forges is a former commune in the Morbihan department of Brittany in north-western France. On 1 January 2019, it was merged into the new commune Forges de Lanouée. Inhabitants of Les Forges are called in French Forgerons.

See also
Communes of the Morbihan department

References

External links

Former communes of Morbihan
Populated places disestablished in 2019